Barbara Pozzobon (born 17 September 1993) is an Italian swimmer competing in open water competitions. She represented Italy at the 2019 World Aquatics Championships in Gwangju, South Korea. She competed in the women's 25 km event and she finished in 13th place.

Career
In 2016, she competed in the women's 25 km event at the European Open Water Championships held in Hoorn, Netherlands. The following year, she competed in the women's 10 kilometre marathon event at the 2017 Summer Universiade held in Taipei, Taiwan.

In 2021, she won the bronze medal in the women's 25 km event at the 2020 European Aquatics Championships held in Budapest, Hungary. She also competed in the women's 5 km event.

References

External links
 

Living people
1993 births
Place of birth missing (living people)
Italian female swimmers
Italian female long-distance swimmers
Competitors at the 2017 Summer Universiade
European Aquatics Championships medalists in swimming
21st-century Italian women
Sportspeople from the Province of Treviso